The Puerto Rican vireo (Vireo latimeri) is a small bird endemic to the archipelago of Puerto Rico and one of the 31 species belonging to the genus Vireo of the family Vireonidae. Its local name is bien-te-veo ("see-you-well", after the call), not to be confused with the unrelated great kiskadee - also known as bien-te-veo - which is found elsewhere.

The Puerto Rican vireo has a gray head, a white breast and a yellowish belly. The species measures, on average, 12 cm (4.72 in) and weighs from 11 to 12 grams (0.388–0.423 oz).

An insectivore, the species's diet consists of grasshoppers, caterpillars, cicadas, beetles and aphids and is complemented with spiders, anoles, and berries.

From 1973 until at least 1996, the species suffered a population decline in the Guánica State Forest. The primary reason for this decline was brood parasitism by the shiny cowbird (Molothrus bonariensis).

See also 

 Fauna of Puerto Rico
 List of birds of Puerto Rico
 List of endemic fauna of Puerto Rico
 List of Puerto Rican birds
 List of Vieques birds
 El Toro Wilderness

References

Further reading

Puerto Rican vireo
Endemic birds of Puerto Rico
Puerto Rican vireo
Puerto Rican vireo